Jánico is a municipality (municipio) of the Santiago province in the Dominican Republic. Within the municipality there are two municipal districts (distritos municipal): El Caimito and Juncalito.

Christopher Columbus established a stockade here in March 1494, to protect his gold mining ambitions.  The prospectivity of gold was established earlier in the year by Alonso de Ojeda's expedition.

Jánico is part of a region known as the Sierra. This region was peopled in the 18th century mostly by ethnic Canarians and French who established a markedly endogamous society in which cousin marriages were fairly common, in order to preserve their whiteness; only a very few were slaveholders. The Sierra received a sizeable amount of white and mulatto refugees from both Saint-Domingue and the Cibao Valley, the former during the Haitian Revolution and the latter amid the Dominican genocide by the Haitian army in 1805.

According to a 2016 genealogical DNA testing by the Genographic Project, the town has the highest percentage of both European and pre-Columbian heritages in the island, at 61.5% and 7.8%, respectively, while the African input (including non-black North Africans) was numbered at 29.6%, the second lowest.

For comparison with other municipalities and municipal districts see the list of municipalities and municipal districts of the Dominican Republic.

References

Municipalities of the Dominican Republic
Populated places in Santiago Province (Dominican Republic)